The 1950 European Championship for Women was the 2nd regional championship held by FIBA Europe for women. The competition was held in Budapest, Hungary and took place May 14–20, 1950. The Soviet Union won the gold medal, with Hungary and Czechoslovakia winning silver and bronze, respectively.

Squads

Preliminary round
The teams where divided in three groups of 4 squads each, with only the top two from each group advancing to the medal round. The remaining teams were put on a second group to define the 7th to 12th spot in the final standings.

Group A

Group B

Group C

Final round

1st to 6th place

7th to 12th place

Final ranking

External links
 FIBA Archive

1950
1950 in women's basketball
1950 in Hungarian women's sport
International women's basketball competitions hosted by Hungary
May 1950 sports events in Europe
1950s in Budapest
International sports competitions in Budapest
1949–50 in European basketball